Cattle are the most common type of large domesticated ungulates.

Cattle may also refer to:

 Bos, the genus of wild and domestic cattle including:
 Beef cattle
 Dairy cattle
 Wild cattle, including aurochs
 Cattle, any kind of livestock
 "Cattle", a song by The Verve Pipe from Villains
 Al-An'am, the sixth sura of the Qur'an, usually translated as “Cattle” or “The Cattle”.
 Emma Cattle (born 1988), British swimmer

See also
 Chattel, any kind of personal property